The 2011 Poli-Farbe Budapest Grand Prix was a women's tennis tournament played on outdoor clay courts. It was the 17th edition of the Budapest Grand Prix, an International-level tournament on the 2011 WTA Tour. It took place in Budapest, Hungary, from 2 July through 10 July 2011. First-seeded Roberta Vinci won the singles title.

Finals

Singles

 Roberta Vinci defeated  Irina-Camelia Begu 6–4, 1–6, 6–4
It was Vinci's 3rd title of the year and 6th of her career.

Doubles

 Anabel Medina Garrigues /  Alicja Rosolska defeated  Natalie Grandin /  Vladimíra Uhlířová,6–2, 6–2

Entrants

Entry list

 1 Rankings are as of June 20, 2011.

Other entrants
The following players received wildcards into the singles main draw
  Tímea Babos
  Vanda Lukács
  Katalin Marosi

The following players received entry from the qualifying draw:

  Estrella Cabeza Candela
  Réka-Luca Jani
  Lenka Juríková
  Aleksandra Krunić

The following player received entry from a lucky loser spot:
  Anna-Giulia Remondina

References

External links
Official website

Budapest Grand Prix
Poli-Farbe Budapest Grand Prix
Buda
Buda